Izuka may refer to:
 Shōzō Iizuka
 Iizuka, Fukuoka